The Canadian Independent Record Production Association (CIRPA) is an organisation representing the independent sector of the Canadian music and sound industry. It was established on 20 January 1971.

The organization has organized group participation of its member labels and distributors in trade shows, including France's MIDEM. Peterson acted as the company's president for many years.

Members

Record labels

Records producers

Record Distributors

References

External links
CIRPA Homepage

1975 establishments in Canada
Music organizations based in Canada
Music industry associations